Mia Locks is a contemporary art curator and museum leader.

Career

Professional Experience
Mia Locks is an independent curator and writer based in Los Angeles. She co-founded and leads Museums Moving Forward, a data-driven research initiative to support equity in the art museum sector, funded by Ford Foundation and Mellon Foundation. She serves on the board of Clockshop, an arts organization in Los Angeles, and as a liaison for the Professional Alliance for Curators of Color (PACC). She previously served on the board of the Brooklyn Children's Museum in New York. She is an editorial advisor on the podcast "Hope & Dread: The Tectonic Shifts of Power in Art." 

Previously, Locks worked as a curator at The Museum of Contemporary Art, Los Angeles (MOCA); Whitney Museum of American Art, New York; and MoMA PS1, New York. Most recently, she was Senior Curator and Head of New Initiatives at the Museum of Contemporary Art, Los Angeles. Prior to MOCA, Locks was co-curator of the 2017 Whitney Biennial, with Christopher Y. Lew. At MoMA PS1, she organized exhibitions including Math Bass: Off the Clock (2015); IM Heung-soon: Reincarnation (2015); Samara Golden: The Flat Side of the Knife (2014); and The Little Things Could Be Dearer (2014). She also co-curated Greater New York (2015), with Douglas Crimp, Peter Eleey, and Thomas J. Lax. As an independent curator, she organized Cruising the Archive: Queer Art and Culture in Los Angeles, 1945–1980 (2011), with David Frantz, at the ONE National Gay & Lesbian Archives, part of the Getty’s inaugural Pacific Standard Time initiative.

Writing and Teaching
Lock's writing has appeared in Afterall, Art Journal, Mousse, and several exhibition catalogues including essays on artists such as Math Bass, Shara Hughes, William Pope.L, and Carrie Moyer. She edited the first monograph of Samara Golden's work, The Flat Side of the Knife, published by MoMA PS1 in 2014. She served on the faculty of the M.A. program in Curatorial Practice at the School of Visual Arts, New York from 2017-2019.

Education
Locks received a BA from Brown University and an MA from the University of Southern California (USC). She was a 2018 fellow at the Center for Curatorial Leadership in New York City.

References

External links
How the podcast ‘Hope & Dread’ examines the turmoil affecting art and artists
MOCA in Los Angeles Appoints Mia Locks as Senior Curator
Whitney.org - Whitney Biennial 2017
Why the Whitney's Humanist, Pro-Diversity Biennial Is a Revelation (NY Times)
The 2017 Whitney Biennial Is a Moving, Forward-Looking Tour de Force—a Triumph (ArtNews)
The New Whitney Biennial Is the Most Political in Decades (New York Magazine)
Openings: Samara Golden (Artforum)
Math Bass: Codes and Keys (W Magazine)
MoMAPS1.org - Greater New York 2015
Greater New York at MoMA PS1 (Artforum)
At 'Greater New York,' Rising Art Stars Meet the Old School (NY Times) 
Im Heung-soon Explores the Horrors Women Endure During War (NY Times)
MoMAPS1.org - The Little Things Could Be Dearer

Living people
Year of birth missing (living people)
Brown University alumni
University of Southern California alumni
School of Visual Arts faculty
American art curators
American women curators
American women writers
People associated with the Whitney Museum of American Art
American women academics
21st-century American women